The 2013 Finnish Cup is the 59th season of the main annual association football cup competition in Finland. It is organised as a single-elimination knock–out tournament. Participation in the competition is voluntary. A total of 152 teams registered for the competition, with 12 teams from the Veikkausliiga, 8 from the Ykkönen, 31 from the Kakkonen, 54 from the Kolmonen and 101 teams from other divisions. 

The tournament started on 5 January 2012 with the first match of Round 1.  Many matches in the early rounds are played on artificial pitches in indoor halls.

Teams

Round 1 
In this round 70 clubs entered from the Finnish fourth level and below, while the other 31 clubs from the lower divisions received byes to the next round. These matches took place between 5 January 2013 and 5 February 2013.

Round 2 
In this round 66 clubs participated from the Finnish fourth level and below. These matches commenced on 27 January 2013.

Round 3 
In this round 72 clubs participated, including 8 teams from the Ykkönen and 31 teams from the Kakkonen . These matches commenced on 20 February 2013.

Round 4
In this round 40 clubs will participate, including 4 teams from the Veikkausliiga (Teams which have been eliminated from the League Cup). These matches commenced on 16 March 2013.

Round 5
In this round 24 clubs will participate, including 4 teams from the Veikkausliiga. These matches commenced on 5 April 2013.

Round 6
In this round 16 clubs will participate. These matches commenced on 25 April 2013.

Quarterfinals
In this round 8 clubs will participate. These matches commenced on 20 May 2013.

Semi-finals

Final

Details

References

External links
 Suomen Cup Official site 

2013
Finnish Cup
Cup